The Gitaru Hydroelectric Power Station, also known as the Gitaru Dam, is a rock and earth-filled embankment dam on the Tana River in Kenya. It straddles the border between Embu and Machakos Counties in the former Eastern Province. The primary purpose of the dam is hydroelectric power generation, and it supports a 225 megawatt power station.

Location
The geographical coordinates of Gitaru Power Station are:00°47'43.0"S, 37°45'09.0"E (Latitude:-0.795278; Longitude:37.752500).

History
Construction of the dam began in 1975 and was completed in 1978. The third generating set, mobilizing the full potential of the power station was not commissioned until 1999. The World Bank lent US$63 million towards the development of this power station. The station is operated by the Kenya Electricity Generating Company and is part of the Seven Forks Scheme.

Overview
The relatively small reservoir relies on steady releases from the Masinga and Kamburu Dams upstream. The reservoir power station is located underground near the left abutment. It contains two 72 megawatt and one 81 megawatt Francis turbine-generators.

See also

Kamburu Hydroelectric Power Station – Upstream
Kindaruma Hydroelectric Power Station – Downstream
List of power stations in Kenya

References

Energy infrastructure completed in 1999
Hydroelectric power stations in Kenya
Dams on the Tana River (Kenya)
Dams in Kenya
Dams completed in 1978
Underground power stations
Embankment dams
Machakos County
Embu County
1999 establishments in Kenya